The 1952 Motocross European Championship was the 1st edition of the Motocross European Championship organized by the FIM and reserved for 500cc motorcycles.

Since 1957 this championship has then become the current Motocross World Championship.

It should not be confused with the European Motocross Championship, now organized by the FIM Europe, whose first edition was held in 1988.

Grands Prix

Final standings

Points are awarded to the top 6 classified finishers.

References

Motocross World Championship seasons
Motocross European Championship